HD 171238 is a 9th magnitude G-type main sequence star located approximately 146 light years away in the constellation Sagittarius. This star is a little bit cooler, less massive, older, and more metal-rich than the Sun, although its age is poorly constrained. In August 2009, it was announced that this star has a planet.

See also
 HD 147018
 HD 204313
 List of extrasolar planets

References

G-type main-sequence stars
171238
091085
Sagittarius (constellation)
Planetary systems with one confirmed planet
Durchmusterung objects